Guy M. "Chalky" Williamson (July 14, 1890 – December 8, 1930) was an American football player and coach. He served as the head football coach at Grove City College in Grove City, Pennsylvania from 1921 to 1923.

Williamson was the starting quarterback for the national champion 1915 Pittsburgh Panthers football team.

He later coached at The Kiski School.  He died in 1930 at age 40.

References

External links
 

1890 births
1930 deaths
American football quarterbacks
Grove City Wolverines football coaches
Pittsburgh Panthers football coaches
Pittsburgh Panthers football players
People from Pendleton, Indiana
Coaches of American football from Indiana
Players of American football from Indiana